Tukay (Tuqay) is a rural locality (a village) in Yelbulaktamaksky Selsoviet, Bizhbulyaksky District, Bashkortostan, Russia. The population was 123 as of 2010. There is 1 street.

Geography 
Tukay is located 17 km southwest of Bizhbulyak (the district's administrative centre) by road. Karimovo is the nearest rural locality.

References 

Rural localities in Bizhbulyaksky District